Qian Xiaojun (born 1974/1975) is a Chinese businessman and billionaire who founded the e-commerce company Bejing United Information Technology.

Forbes lists his net worth as of April 2022 at $1.1 billion USD.

References 

Chinese billionaires
Chinese company founders
20th-century Chinese businesspeople
21st-century Chinese businesspeople
Living people
1970s births